Kathrin Beck (born 8 March 1966, in Vienna) is an Austrian actress and former ice dancer. Competing with her brother, Christoff Beck, she became the 1987 Winter Universiade champion, a two-time Skate Canada International medalist (silver in 1987, bronze in 1985), and a six-time Austrian national champion (1983–1988). They finished fifth at the 1988 Winter Olympics in Calgary, Canada. They trained six days a week, fifty weeks a year.

After retiring from skating, Beck became an actress. She is a member of the Akademie des Österreichischen Films and Verband der Österreichischen FilmschauspielerInnen. She married Christian Klikovits.

Results
(ice dance with Beck)

References

External links

Navigation

Austrian female ice dancers
Olympic figure skaters of Austria
Figure skaters at the 1988 Winter Olympics
Universiade medalists in figure skating
1966 births
Living people
Universiade gold medalists for Austria
Universiade bronze medalists for Austria
Competitors at the 1985 Winter Universiade
Competitors at the 1987 Winter Universiade